Alice N' Chains was an American glam metal band from Seattle, Washington, formed in 1986 by former members of Sleze. Toward the end of their run as Sleze, discussions arose about changing their name to Alice in Chains. However, due to concerns over the reference to female bondage, the group ultimately chose to spell it as Alice N' Chains. They performed under this moniker over about a 12-month period and recorded two demos before breaking up on friendly terms in 1987. One of its members, Layne Staley, ultimately took the name that he and his former bandmates had initially flirted with when he joined a different group a few months later that became known as Alice in Chains.

History

Vocalist Layne Staley, guitarist Nick Pollock, bassist Johnny Bacolas, and drummer James Bergstrom began performing in what would become the last lineup of Sleze in 1986, when founding member Bacolas rejoined after a brief stint in another band called Ascendant and took up the bass slot for the first time; originally he played guitar. After his return, Bacolas says the band began to discuss changing their name to Alice in Chains due to a conversation he had with Russ Klatt, singer from Slaughterhouse Five:

However, Staley's mother Nancy McCallum has said she still did not approve of this at first:

Johnny Bacolas stated that the decision to use the apostrophe-N combination in their name had nothing to do with the Los Angeles band Guns N' Roses. The name change happened in 1986, a year before Guns N' Roses became a household name with their first album Appetite for Destruction, which was released in July 1987.

According to Staley, the reason they chose this name was because they wanted to dress in drag and play heavy metal as a joke.

The band performed around the Seattle area playing Slayer and Armored Saint covers.

Discography
Alice N' Chains recorded two demos known primarily as "Demo No. 1" and "Demo No. 2"; both from 1987. Physical copies of the cassettes are extremely rare as only 100 of "Demo No. 1" were made, although bootleg copies can be found online on filesharing programs and YouTube.

Pre-production for "Demo No. 1" began whilst the band were still calling themselves Sleze and with a different bass player named Mike Mitchell, who appears on the tracks "Fat Girls" and "Over the Edge" according to producer Tim Branom. Recording for these two tracks took place at London Bridge Studio with the help of its founding engineer brother Rick and Raj Parashar. A few months later, Mitchell left the band and Bacolas rejoined as their bass player. They added one more song called "Lip Lock Rock" to the demo before changing their name to Alice N' Chains.

Demo No. 1 track listing
 "Lip Lock Rock" – 4:24
 "Fat Girls" – 3:39
 "Over the Edge" – 2:44

Demo No. 2 track listing
 "Sealed with a Kiss" – 2:49
 "Ya Yeah Ya" – 3:11
 "Glamorous Girls" – 2:48
 "Don't Be Satisfied" – 3:27
 "Hush, Hush" – 2:29
 "Football" – 2:01

Post–Alice N' Chains
Shortly after Alice N' Chains broke up, Staley joined a different group of musicians led by guitarist Jerry Cantrell that eventually took up the name Alice in Chains. This band rose to international fame as part of the grunge movement of the early 1990s, along with other Seattle bands such as Nirvana, Pearl Jam, and Soundgarden. Staley also formed the supergroup Mad Season along with Pearl Jam guitarist Mike McCready, Screaming Trees drummer Barrett Martin and bassist John Baker Saunders.

Meanwhile, Pollock formed the band My Sister's Machine, taking up mostly vocal duties as their primary lyricist. He later sang in the band Soulbender, which also  featured Queensrÿche guitarist Michael Wilton.

Bergstrom became a founding member of the band Second Coming and was later joined by Bacolas, who replaced Ron "Junkeye" Holt on bass. Staley made a guest appearance on their debut album L.O.V.Evil. This band signed to Capitol Records in May 1998 and recorded two more studio albums and one extended play before breaking up in 2008. Since then, Bacolas has recorded and released music with the bands The Crying Spell and Lotus Crush.

See also
List of glam metal bands and artists

References

External links

1986 establishments in Washington (state)
American speed metal musical groups
Glam metal musical groups from Washington (state)
Heavy metal musical groups from Washington (state)
Layne Staley
Musical groups established in 1986
Musical groups disestablished in 1987
Musical groups from Seattle
Musical quartets